The New Evangelical Reformed Church was founded in  by a Rev. Ferdinand Teura a former minister of the Maói Protestant Church. He left the church because the disagreement with the church's leadership. He founded the Confederation of Reformed churches, but he was expelled from this church and created another one. The denomination consists of a single congregation. The church's official languages are French and Maóhi.

References

Reformed denominations in Oceania
Religion in New Caledonia
Religion in French Polynesia